Frontierland is the twelfth solo album by Australian guitarist and songwriter Ed Kuepper recorded in 1996 and released on the Hot label.

Reception
Frontierland was nominated for an ARIA for the Best Independent Release at the ARIA Music Awards of 1997.

The Allmusic review by Jack Rabid awarded the album 4 stars and states "here we find Kuepper more successfully tackling mood rock... a non-compromising, neo-ambient, warm soundtrack-like post-punk album".

Musician Dave Graney said, "I don't think Ed Kuepper's Frontierland was lauded and respected as the major work of a great songwriter, player, and studio cat that it was."

Track listing
All compositions by Ed Kuepper
 "All of These Things" - 4:45  
 "Fireman Joe" - 4:23  
 "The Weepin' Willow" - 4:49  
 "How Would You Plead?" - 3:20  
 "M.D.D.P. Limited" - 4:37  
 "Pushin' Fear II" - 6:41  
 "Rough Neck Blues" - 3:20  
 "Someone Told Me" - 3:30  
 "Poor Howard" - 4:59

Personnel
Ed Kuepper - vocals, electric guitar, acoustic guitar, bass, mandolin 
Charlie Cole - mellotron, keyboards, military drums 
Clayton Doley - organ, pedal bass 
Jerome - electric bass 
Adam Armstrong (track 5), Paul Burton (track 2) - double bass 
Mark Collins - banjo 
Christian Marsh - chromatic harmonica 
James Greening - trombone, tuba 
Miroslav Bukovsky - trumpet 
Sir Alfonso - loops, samples 
Mark Dawson - drums, octopad 
Phil Hartel - violin (track 1) 
Mark Punch - electric guitar, backing vocals (track 1) 
Chad Wackerman - drums  (track 2) 
Paula Punch Singers (track 9), The Sergeants Three (tracks 3 and 6) - backing vocals

References

Hot Records albums
Ed Kuepper albums
1996 albums